is a 1985 Japanese film directed by Shunya Ito. It was Japan's submission to the 58th Academy Awards for the Academy Award for Best Foreign Language Film, but was not accepted as a nominee. It won the award for Best Film at the Japan Academy Prize ceremony.

Cast
 Yukiyo Toake – Keiko Takano
 Minoru Chiaki – Fuyukichi Takano
 Teruhiko Saigo – Haruo Takano
 Yumiko Nogawa – Nobue Kaneko
 Haruko Kato – Kikuyo Takano
 Yoshiko Nakada – Tomoko Iizuka
 Sayoko Ninomiya – Mitsue Takano
 Ittoku Kishibe – Yoshikazu Ishimoto

See also
 List of submissions to the 58th Academy Awards for Best Foreign Language Film
 List of Japanese submissions for the Academy Award for Best Foreign Language Film

References

Bibliography
 
 
 
 
 

1985 films
Films directed by Shunya Itō
1980s Japanese-language films
Films about Alzheimer's disease
Toei Company films
Picture of the Year Japan Academy Prize winners
1980s Japanese films